"Khatam al-Anbiya Central Headquarters" is the unified combatant command headquarters of the Iranian Armed Forces, under direct command of its General Staff. It is tasked with planning and coordinating joint military operations within the Iranian forces. As of 2016, its commander is Major General Gholamali Rashid.

In 2016, the KCHQ was separated from the Armed Forces General Staff as a standing independent command responsible for operational command and control (C2); previously, the KCHQ would only be stood up in wartime.

References 

Iran
Military of Iran
General Staff of the Armed Forces of the Islamic Republic of Iran